Edmonton West stylized as Edmonton (West) from 1917 to 1921, was a provincial electoral district in Alberta, Canada, mandated to return a single member to the Legislative Assembly of Alberta from 1917 to 1921 and again from 1963 to 1971.

History
The riding has existed twice, the first incarnation was created in 1917 when the Edmonton electoral district broke up into Edmonton East and Edmonton West electoral districts. The two districts were merged along with Edmonton South in 1921 to reform the Edmonton electoral district.

The second incarnation was carved out of the south portion of Edmonton North West in 1963. In 1971 the riding was renamed Edmonton-Glenora.

Members of the Legislative Assembly (MLAs)

Election results

1917 general election

1963 general election

1967 general election

See also
List of Alberta provincial electoral districts
Edmonton West

References

Further reading

External links
Elections Alberta
The Legislative Assembly of Alberta

Former provincial electoral districts of Alberta